Phi Sigs is a nickname which might refer to members of either:

Phi Sigma Kappa (ΦΣΚ) Men's Social Fraternity
Phi Sigma Epsilon (ΦΣΕ) Men's Social Fraternity, which merged into Phi Sigma Kappa in 1985
Phi Sigma Sigma (ΦΣΣ) Women's Social Sorority